The Spearman Medal is an early-career award of the British Psychological Society's Research Board, given in recognition of outstanding published work in psychology which represents a significant body of work in terms of theoretical contributions, originality, and impact. The award was inaugurated in 1965 and is named in honour of Charles Spearman.

Medal winners are invited to give the Spearman Medal Lecture at the society's annual conference. In 2021, it was decided to retire this award in view of concern at the links Spearman had with the eugenics movement.

List of medal winners

Source: British Psychology Society

See also

List of psychology awards
List of awards named after people

References

Psychology awards
British awards
British Psychological Society